Mikołaj Kubica (27 October 1945 – 19 July 2020) was a Polish gymnast. He competed at the 1964 Summer Olympics, the 1968 Summer Olympics and the 1972 Summer Olympics.

References

External links
 
 
 
 

1945 births
2020 deaths
Polish male artistic gymnasts
Olympic gymnasts of Poland
Gymnasts at the 1964 Summer Olympics
Gymnasts at the 1968 Summer Olympics
Gymnasts at the 1972 Summer Olympics
People from Rybnik